Jimmy Giraudon (born 16 January 1992) is a French professional footballer who plays as a defender for  club Saint-Étienne.

Career
In summer 2016, Giraudon joined Troyes on a two-year deal. On 31 January 2022, he moved abroad after agreeing to a loan deal with Segunda División side Leganés for the remainder of the season.

On 24 June 2022, Giraudon signed for Ligue 2 side Saint-Étienne on a two-year contract. He chose the number 5 jersey at the club.

Career statistics

Honours 
Troyes

 Ligue 2: 2020–21

References

External links
 
 
 

1992 births
Living people
Sportspeople from La Rochelle
French footballers
Association football defenders
Chamois Niortais F.C. players
Grenoble Foot 38 players
ES Troyes AC players
CD Leganés players
AS Saint-Étienne players
Ligue 1 players
Ligue 2 players
Championnat National players
Championnat National 2 players
Championnat National 3 players
Segunda División players
French expatriate footballers
French expatriate sportspeople in Spain
Expatriate footballers in Spain
Footballers from Nouvelle-Aquitaine